MTV Polska is the Polish-language version of the general entertainment channel MTV. It was launched on July 7, 2000, replacing local music channel Atomic TV. The channel is operated by Paramount Networks EMEAA from its headquarters in Warsaw.

The channel broadcasts a number of programming in Polish with either subtitled or dubbed programming from the American and British versions of MTV. The channel is complemented by the local Polish channel MTV Music.

On July 17, 2012 channel started to broadcast in 16:9 picture format. The channel was till 17 february 2021  under the jurisdiction of Dutch broadcasting regulator Commissariaat Voor De Media. Since February 2021, MTV Polska has used a broadcasting license from the Czech Republic of RRTV.

Shows
 Alarm MTV / Alert MTV
 MTV Kofeina / MTV Caffeine
 Music Non Stop
 Player MTV
 Alt.MTV
 Clip Me
 MTV Crispy News
 MTV Party Zone
 Don't Stop The Music
 Nitro Circus
 MTV MAXXX HITS
 Starter
 Made
 Pimp My Ride (US, UK)
 Pimp My Room (PL)
 Dismissed
 Making The Video
 Celebrity Deathmatch
 MTV Cribs (US, PL)
 Penetratorzy / Room Raiders (US, PL)
 Moje Supersłodkie Urodziny / My Super Sweet 16 (UK & US)
 Date My Mom
 Real World
 Rekreacje (PL)
 Bazar (PL)
 Pogromcy Rekordów
 Uparty jak Hogan / Hogan Knows Best
 Uparta jak Brook / Brooke Knows Best
 Jackass
 Dirty Sanchez
 MTV Wkręca / Punk'd
 Wanna Come In?
 Zakład / I Bet You Will
 Pięść Mistrza Zen
 Króliczki Playboya
 Najlepsi Tancerze Ameryki
 Co na to tato? / Parental Control
 Efekt Eks
 Exposed
 Next
 Moja własna gwiazda
 Wzgórza Hollywood
 Szał Ciał (PL)
 Od Zipa do Gentlemana
 Raperska rodzina Runa
 A jak Amore
 Making the Band
 True Life
 America's Next Top Model
 Making the Video
 Kardashianowie / Kardashians
 Zakochaj się w Tili Tequili / A Shot At Love With Tila Tequila
 Zakochaj się w Tili Tequili II / A Shot at Love II with Tila Tequila
 Zakochaj się w Rikki i Vikki / A Double Shot at Love with the Ikki Twins
 Paris Hilton kumpela na zabój / Paris Hilton's My New Best Friend Forever
 Księżniczki z Piekła Rodem
 Księżniczki Piękności / Tiara Girls
 Diary Of, Czyli w Pogoni za... (PL)
 Włatcy Móch (PL)
1000 złych uczynków (PL)
 Fur TV
 Udręki młodego Bergera
 Blue Mountain State
 Jersey Shore
 SpongeBob SquarePants (2004 [voice-over], 2012 [dub])
etc.

Presenters
 Katarzyna Sowińska
 Katarzyna Burzyńska
 Wojciech Łozowski
 Paulina Jaskólska
 Marcin Prokop
 Michał Koterski
 Joanna Horodyńska
 Karolina Kozak
 Pola Czarnecka

References

Television channels in Poland
MTV channels
Television channels and stations established in 2000
Music organisations based in Poland
2000 establishments in Poland